Randas José Vilela Batista (Passos, Minas Gerais, 1947) is a Brazilian medical doctor and cardiac surgeon. He graduated in medicine at the Federal University of Paraná (UFPR) in 1972. After that, he moved to United States to do residency. Twelve years later, after passing through Canada, England and France, he would end up with a postgraduate degree in cardiac surgery. Then he returned to teach medicine in Brazil.

Cardiology
Doctor Randas developed eight techniques for cardiac care, considered revolutionary. The best known of these is the "Batista procedure", that removes a piece of the dilated heart (partial left ventriculectomy) to treat heart failure patients. Thus, the method would exclude the need of a transplant. The procedure became famous around the world, but there are some questions about its efficiency. According to information from the Brazilian Society of Cardiovascular Surgery, the technique has become obsolete. Four years since the first operation, only 25% of the patients survived.

Randas does not consider these data real. According to him, data from Instituto do Coração (InCor), which performs the surgery, indicates that survival 5 years after surgery is of 60%. He also suggests the reason why, in the United States, they do not perform procedures with the name "Batista Surgery": the technique is considered experimental there. In this way, the public authorities would not pay for the surgery, leaving to the interested patient the option to change the terminology to "ventricular aneurysm resection", which in practice is the same procedure, to have the treatment paid by the U.S. Government.

The techniques invented by Batista have rendered him honors in European countries and the United States. He had his name engraved on a memorial on the island of Kos (which honors the father of medicine, Hippocrates), in Greece, and in United States he was considered one of the fifteen world heroes of medicine in a list of Time magazine and CNN. He is also the president of Fundação do Coração Vilela Batista (Vilela Batista Heart Foundation) that, in partnership with the Japanese holding group , built in the city of Apucarana, Paraná, the Hospital do Coração Torao Tokuda (Torao Tokuda Heart Hospital), which started up in 2012 and closed in 2015, having operated only with an outpatient clinic during that period.

References

External links
Piece of My Heart Article about Randas and the Batista procedure at Discover Magazine.
Randas J. Vilela Batista, MD Interview with doctor Randas Batista at The Cardiothoracic Surgery Network (archived).
 Operação Batista Article about the Batista procedure at Technology & Innovation Network of Rio de Janeiro (archived).
 Sou doido mesmo Randas interview for the magazine Veja (archived).

Brazilian cardiologists
1947 births
Living people
People from Minas Gerais
Federal University of Paraná alumni